The 1975 Nobel Prize in Literature was awarded to the Italian poet Eugenio Montale (1896–1981) "for his distinctive poetry which, with great artistic sensitivity, has interpreted human values under the sign of an outlook on life with no illusions". He is the fifth Italian laureate for the literature prize.

Laureate

Along with Giuseppe Ungaretti and Salvatore Quasimodo, Eugenio Montale is associated with the poetic school of hermeticsm, the Italian variant of the French symbolism movement, although Montale himself did not consider himself to be part of the hermetic school. His poetry is often compared to T. S. Eliot. When the Swedish Academy awarded him with the Nobel Prize in 1975, they called him “one of the most important poets of the contemporary West”.

Award ceremony
At the award ceremony on 10 December 1975, Anders Österling of the Swedish Academy said:

References

External links
Award ceremony speech nobelprize.org

1975